Hazaribagh Assembly constituency is an assembly constituency in  the Indian state of Jharkhand.

Members of Assembly 
1962: Gyani Ram, Indian National Congress
2005: Saurabh Narayan Singh, Indian National Congress
2009: Saurabh Narayan Singh, Indian National Congress
2014: Manish Jaiswal, Bharatiya Janata Party
2019: Manish Jaiswal, Bharatiya Janata Party

See also
Vidhan Sabha
List of states of India by type of legislature

References

Assembly constituencies of Jharkhand
Hazaribagh